{{Infobox government cabinet
|cabinet_name = Stefan Löfven's second cabinet
|cabinet_number = 54th
|incumbent = 
|interim cabinet desolved = 
|jurisdiction = Sweden
|image = File:Regeringen Löfven II på Lejonbacken i januari 2019.jpg
|image_size = 300px
|caption=The Löfven II cabinet outside the Stockholm Royal Palace, January 2019
|date_formed = 21 January 2019
|date_dissolved = 9 July 2021
|government_head = Stefan Löfven
|government_head_history = 
|deputy_government_head = Per Bolund (de jure) 
Morgan Johansson (de facto)
|state_head = Carl XVI Gustaf
|current_number = 22
|former_members_number = 
|total_number = 
|political_party = Social DemocratsGreen Party
|legislature_status = Centre-left coalition minority governmentwith confidence & supply from the Centre Party and Liberals
|election = 2018 election
|next_election = 
|legislature_term = 
|budget = 
|opposition_cabinet = 
|opposition_party = Moderate PartySweden DemocratsLeft PartyChristian Democrats
|opposition_leader = 
|incoming_formation = 
|outgoing_formation = 
|previous = Löfven I Cabinet
|successor = Löfven III Cabinet
}}

The second cabinet of Stefan Löfven was the Government of Sweden from 21 January 2019 to 9 July 2021. It was a coalition, consisting of two parties: the Social Democrats and the Green Party. The cabinet was installed on 21 January 2019, following the 2018 general election. 

In a vote of no-confidence held on 21 June 2021, the Prime Minister was voted out of office. The cabinet remained a caretaker government until a new cabinet was appointed.

With only 116 out of 349 seats (33%) in the Riksdag (Swedish parliament), the "red-green" coalition began as one of the smallest minority governments in Swedish history, and it relied on support from other parties in the Riksdag.

The cabinet was installed following a formal government meeting with King Carl XVI Gustaf on 21 January 2019. Stefan Löfven had previously announced his cabinet ministers at a parliament session.

 Policy 

 January Agreement 

The cabinet was one of the weakest governments in Swedish history. Thus, it relied on support from other parties in the Riksdag. Holding only 33% of seats in parliament, this red-green government's retention of power was the result of a joint agreement between the Social Democrats, the Green Party, the Centre Party and the Liberals. The 16-page document, signed in January, which is commonly referred to as Januariavtalet (lit. the January Agreement) dictated government policy during this time.

The agreement included the following main points:

 The Centre Party and Liberals agree to abstain from voting against Stefan Löfven's re-election.
 The Left Party shall not receive any influence over Swedish politics for the following years.
 Passing a test in Swedish and in the basics of civics shall be mandatory to acquire Swedish citizenship.
 The värnskatt tax is to be abolished by 2020. This tax, which was adopted in 1995 by the Social Democrats, is a surtax of five additional percentage points on anyone's annual income that exceeds 703,000 crowns.
 The Employment Protection Act (LAS) is to be amended by no later than 2021. The amendments are to include additional exceptions to the rules of seniority regarding redundancy terminations of employees. A government inquiry was started in April 2019.
 The government is to refrain from proposing legislation which limits or prevents the private sector from generating profits from their work in the welfare system.
 Taxes on environmentally unfriendly goods and services are to be increased while taxes on salaries are to be lowered. This is known as grön skatteväxling (lit. "green tax shifting") in Swedish politics and will amount to 15 billion crowns (circa €1.38 billion).
 The increased tax on retirees is to be abolished by 2020 and general pensions are to be increased by 2021.
 A "family week" is to be introduced. Working parents who have children between the ages of four and sixteen receive three days off each within the framework of parental insurance. These days are intended to be used when children cannot attend school due to school breaks, etc. Single parents receive six days.
 The tax reduction on household services (the RUT-avdrag) is to include an additional range of services.
 Employers' state fees are to be decreased.
 The Public Employment Service will undergo a fundamental reform and will have to compete with private employment agencies.

Additionally, the agreement includes investments and policy changes across many areas:

 Infrastructure 
 Investments are to be made into the countryside, such as increased possibilities for distance education. The government is also to ensure that no more government services locate their headquarters in the capital, Stockholm, during the government term.
 The national digital infrastructure is to be drastically improved, a goal has been set to guarantee that 95% of all households and businesses has access to a broadband speed of at least 100 Mbit/s by 2020.
 Investments in the railway and road infrastructure across the country will amount to 700 billion crowns (~€65.2 billion) between 2018 and 2029.
 The Swedish Transport Administration is to be tasked with maintaining daily over-night trains to several European cities.

 Environment 
 A proposition regarding fossil fuel-free transports aims to prohibit the sale of new gasoline- and diesel-driven cars. An inquiry into such a prohibition is to be made during 2019 and a prohibition would require approval by the European Commission.
 The abolished aviation tax is to be reintroduced.

 Social integration 
 The punishment for honor-related violent crimes is to be strengthened.
 Municipalities shall reserve the right to limit state aid to those asylum seekers who manage to find their own housing in areas with socio-economic difficulties.

 Housing 
 Rents on newly-built housing is to be unregulated and left to the property owner.
 Four separate taxes which are collectively known as the flyttskatt ("move tax") are to be abolished

 Education 
 Academic grading is to be allowed as of year 4 (age 10) of elementary school, instead of year 6, but it is to be voluntary for schools to grade students until year 6.
 No more privately owned schools with a religious orientation are to be opened.
 The possibilities for a state-run education system are to be explored.

 Personal assistance 
 The right to receive and subsidy for assistance for care revolving around breathing and tube feeding, which was abolished in the Moderate and Christian Democrat budget, is to be restored.

 Security 
 10,000 more police employees by 2024.
 A principle to prohibit weapon export deals with non-democratic countries which are known to participate militarily in the Yemeni conflict until the conflict ends.

The government proposed to reduce employers’ social security contributions to increase young people's employment in 2019. The Swedish fossil-free initiatives proposals amounted to 1,950 million crowns, including investments in biogas and home charging of 750 million kronor, wetland protection at 200 million, and solar cell subsidies of 300 million. Aviation tax of 785 million crowns a year is to be collected.

 2020 state budget 
Minister for Finance Magdalena Andersson delivered the 2020 budget proposal to the Riksdag on 18 September 2019. The reforms of the budget were in accordance with the January agreement and were estimated to cost the state 30 billion crowns.

Arguably the most significant reform in the budget proposal was the abolished värnskatt tax. The värnskatt was a surtax which was adopted in 1995 by the Social Democratic Carlsson Cabinet. It taxed five additional percentage points on anyone's annual income that exceeds 703,000 crowns. The reform had been pushed by the Liberals for a long time.

The largest reform in terms of increasing revenue in the budget was the three-crown tax on plastic bags which was expected to generate 2 billion crowns in tax revenue.

Other tax-political reforms included the lowering of taxes for the elderly with a pension of at least 17,000 crowns per month, as well as a tax break for people living in certain rural municipalities. The eligible municipalities cover most of Norrland and Dalarna and parts of Värmland and Dalsland.

The regions and municipalities of Sweden received a general contribution of five billion crowns. The municipalities received 3.5 billion crowns and the regions will received 1.5 billion. The funds were to be distributed equally in proportion to each subdivision's population. An additional 410 million crowns were allocated towards combatting and preventing segregation on the local and regional levels, with a reserve fund of 85 million made available for the same purpose.

According to Dagens Nyheter, 110 of Sweden's municipalities would be operating at a deficit during the second half of 2019.

The government claimed that the reforms would increase the gap between the poor and the rich, as well as between men and women.

 Measures against gang crime 
In September 2019, talks were held between the government parties and the centre-right Moderates, Christian Democrats, Centre Party and Liberals regarding an agreement concerning measures for combating gang violence and organized crime. Negotiations broke down on 21 September 2019, with three of the centre-right parties (M, L and KD) leaving the talks. The Moderate spokesman for justice affairs stated that "We can agree to a lot of the crime prevention work [proposals]. Regarding the strengthening of justice policy, I can affirm that we are still very far from each other". The Moderates demanded additional police officers, the doubling of prison time for gang-related offences, the ability to turn state's evidence and the abolition of mandatory lenient sentencing for young offenders. The Christian Democrats, Centre Party and Liberals pushed for the ability of witnesses to testify on the condition of anonymity.

On the same day, following the breakdown of the negotiations, the government announced their own package of measures to combat gang crime. The package consisted of 34 proposals which included giving the police the ability to read and listen to encrypted communications, transferring certain police responsibilities to community service officers and increasing the mandatory minimum sentences for several crimes such as weapons and explosives offences, recruiting youth for criminal activities and for conveying narcotics to others. Moderate leader Ulf Kristersson announced on 22 September that they would support the government package, provided that the proposals lead to concrete reforms. The Christian Democrats stated that they would support certain parts of the package.

Following the shooting of a 15-year-old boy in Malmö on the night of 9 November, the opposition parties called for a vote of no-confidence against Minister of Justice Morgan Johansson, deeming him at least partly responsible for the recent wave of violent crime. Two days later, on 11 November, the police launched Operation Rimfrost with the mission of curbing gang violence, with police officials claiming that a "difference would be noticed" within roughly six months. The vote of no-confidence against the Minister of Justice was held on 13 November and failed, accruing only 131 of the 175 'yes' votes required.

 Response to Covid-19 outbreak 

On 24 February, the government announced that they would be spending 40 million SEK (roughly €4 million) towards the World Health Organization's efforts in containing the 2019–20 coronavirus outbreak. Public gatherings of more than 500 people were banned on 11 March. A set of emergency reforms were announced on 16 March to curb the economic effects of the coronavirus. The state will provide all employees with paid sickness leave and will also give companies more time to pay taxes. The reform package has a capped budget of 300 billion crowns. On 17 March, schools providing secondary and higher education (gymnasium and universities) were advised to close and to teach classes remotely. In conjunction with the European Union announcing a 30-day travel ban for people entering the Union, the government instituted a ban on non-essential travel from non-EU nations to Sweden in the evening of 17 March.

 Employment Protection Act (LAS) talks 
Negotiations between the Swedish Trade Union Confederation and the Confederation of Swedish Enterprise regarding the reform of the Employment Protection Act (Lagen om anställningsskydd,'' LAS) failed on 1 October 2020. As the reform of LAS was stipulated to occur by no later than 2022, unless negotiations were resumed, the government was expected to step in and execute the reforms put forward in their 2019 inquiry. The Left Party was firmly against the suggested reforms and vowed to launch a vote of no-confidence against the government if they were to go through with the reforms. The right-wing opposition parties, wishing to oust the government, indicated that they would support the Left during such a vote, which would be enough for a majority. Trade union and enterprise leaders resumed talks on 14 October and presented a batch of proposed reforms to the government in December 2020.

Controversies

Begler Affair 
In 2018, the government fired Director-General Ann-Marie Begler of the Social Insurance Agency. The Minister for Social Security, Annika Strandhäll, stated that the government had been dissatisfied with Begler's performance for a long time and that she had voluntarily resigned, something that Begler denied. Additionally, e-mails were sent to the Riksdag Constitution Committee by senior managers at the Social Insurance Agency. The senior managers accused Minister Strandhäll of lying and demanded that Begler be reinstated.

Criticism from major political parties started with the Moderates, with Ulf Kristersson accusing the government of firing the Director-General for the purposes of electioneering. The liberal-conservative party spearheaded an effort to sack the Minister for Social Security through a motion of no-confidence, an effort which had the support of the Moderates, the Christian Democrats and the Sweden Democrats. On the evening of 27 May, the Centre Party announced that it would not be supporting the vote of no-confidence against Strandhäll. The vote was held on 28 May and failed, with 172 MPs supporting the motion, 113 voting against and 59 abstaining. Support is required from at least 175 MPs. Strandhäll received a formal warning from the Riksdag Constitution Committee in June 2019.

Reform of the Public Employment Service 
In accordance with the January Agreement, the government initiated a reform of the Public Employment Service to open the market for competition from employment agencies in the private sector. This, in combination with the adoption of the conservative-authored 2019 state budget, resulted in a major budget cut for the agency. In early 2019, the Service announced that they would be closing 132 offices around the country, sacking 4,500 employees. The cuts drew severe criticism from opposition parties, with the Left Party threatening a vote of no-confidence against Minister for Employment Eva Nordmark on 21 November, a move which by December was backed by the three conservative opposition parties. As a result, the government was forced to put the reform on hold for a year. In a memo, the government authorized the Public Employment Service to ensure adequate service in areas where the closures of local offices had been ordered. 

As of February 2020, service had been restored in 99 of the 132 areas where the agency had previously decided to close their offices.

Market rent reform and government crisis 

As part of the January Agreement, the government had announced an inquiry into reforming the housing market by allowing for unregulated rents on newly-built residential housing developments. The inquiry was completed on 4 June 2021 and the proposal would give property owners the ability to freely set rents on newly-constructed housing, upon agreement with their tenants. Rents would primarily be allowed to increase in line only with the consumer price index, or due to a "change in circumstances". If the landlord and tenant cannot come to an agreement, the rent amount can be tried with the rent tribunal. 

In response, the Left Party presented the government with an ultimatum on 15 June. The government would receive 48 hours to withdraw the proposal, or else the Left would initiate a vote of no-confidence against the Prime Minister. On 17 June, the Left Party formally requested a vote of no-confidence and shortly thereafter, the Sweden Democrats filed their own such request. The Moderates and Christian Democrats announced that they would vote in line with the opposition against the government. The vote was held on 10 a.m on 21 June, and Prime Minister Stefan Löfven was voted out of office by vote of 181–109, with 59 MPs abstaining. According to the Instrument of Government, the Prime Minister has one week to either resign or announce whether or not to call for a snap election. On 28 June, Löfven offered his resignation, leaving the government in a caretaker capacity until a new government is appointed. The Speaker of the Riksdag was tasked with finding a government constellation to form a new cabinet. On 7 July, Stefan Löfven was re-elected as Prime Minister and his third government was formed on 9 June.

Ministers 
|}

References

External links 

 List of current government ministers – "Sweden's newest government" (2019)

Footnotes 

2019 establishments in Sweden
Coalition governments
Politics of Sweden
Lofven, Stefan
Lofven
Cabinets disestablished in 2021
2021 disestablishments in Sweden
2018 Swedish general election